"Make It Right" is a song by South Korean boy band BTS. It was released digitally on April 12, 2019, as part of the extended play Map of the Soul: Persona. It was remixed and re-released, featuring Lauv, as the second single from the EP on October 18, 2019.

Background and release 
The song was first teased by Suga on Twitter, showing an image of a track and tagging Ed Sheeran with "This is for you." On April 11, a day before release, it was announced as the song Suga had teased in prior months. The title of the song appeared to recount Jin's monologue in the 2017 Love Yourself Highlight Reel during the band's Love Yourself era.

The album version of the song was released digitally on April 12, 2019. The remixed version was teased on the group's and Lauv's social media platforms and officially released on October 18, 2019.

Promotion 
The song was promoted on M Countdown April 19, 2019. BTS also performed the original version of the song The Late Show with Stephen Colbert in May 2019. Additionally, BTS performed the song on iHeart Radio Jingle Ball and in New York City's Times Square on Dick Clark’s New Year’s Rockin’ Eve With Ryan Seacrest.

Composition and lyrics 
"Make It Right" has been described as a falsetto-vocal heavy contemporary R&B track that is, "sung with a breathy, close-miked intensity that gives the curious illusion of intimacy." It uses a looped horn throughout the song, with Rolling Stone comparing it to Amerie's "1 Thing" or Mario's "Let Me Love You" echoing sounds from the 2000s. It is backed with synthesizers, and the lyrics talk about the wish to make the world better and improve relationships. It also speaks about their biggest accomplishments and that without their fans it would feel empty. Newsweek said although the topic of the song can be heavy, the instrumental is light. In the remixed version, Lauv replaces the Korean-language first verse with his own lyrics.

The remix version of the song is in the key of G major with 98 beats per minute while the original is G major with 106 beats per minute.

Reception 
The New York Times said about the track: "It has some of Ed Sheeran's signature soft-soul gestures, but BTS renders [it] with complexity," while Jae-ha Kim from the Chicago Tribune called it "hopeful and optimistic".

Credits and personnel 
The song's original credits are adapted from the CD liner notes of Map of the Soul: Persona. Lauv's credits as a songwriter on the remixed version are adapted from Spotify.

 BTS – primary vocals
Fred "FRED" Gibson – producing, songwriting, drums, keyboard, synthesizer, programming
Ed Sheeran – songwriting
Benjy Gibson – songwriting
Jo Hill – songwriting
RM – songwriting, rap arrangement, recording engineer

Suga – songwriting
J-Hope – songwriting
Ari Leff – songwriting (remixed single version only)
Jungkook – chorus
Pdogg – vocal arrangement, rap arrangement, recording engineer
Hiss Noise – recording engineer, digital engineer 
El Capitxn – digital engineer

Charts

Original version

Remix version

Certifications

References 

2019 songs
2019 singles
BTS songs
Lauv songs
Songs written by Ed Sheeran
Songs written by Fred Again
Songs written by RM (rapper)
Songs written by J-Hope
Songs written by Suga (rapper)
Hybe Corporation singles